The 1957 Washington Huskies football team was an American football team that represented the University of Washington during the 1957 NCAA University Division football season.  In its first season under head coach Jim Owens, the team compiled a 3–6–1 record, sixth in the Pacific Coast Conference, and was outscored 212 to 120.

Following the previous season, first-year head coach Darrell Royal left for Texas in December, after less than ten months in Seattle. Hired in January, Owens was a teammate of Royal's at Oklahoma and was an assistant coach under Bear Bryant for the previous six years at Kentucky and Texas A&M.

Schedule

All-Coast

NFL Draft selections
Two University of Washington Huskies were selected in the 1958 NFL Draft, which lasted thirty rounds with 360 selections.

References

Washington
Washington Huskies football seasons
Washington Huskies football